Cryptocladocera is a genus of bristle flies in the family Tachinidae. There are at least four described species in Cryptocladocera.

Species
These four species belong to the genus Cryptocladocera:
 Cryptocladocera bezzii Arnaud, 1963 c g
 Cryptocladocera mojingensis Arnaud, 1963 c g
 Cryptocladocera pichilinguensis Arnaud, 1963 c g
 Cryptocladocera prodigiosa Bezzi, 1923 c g
Data sources: i = ITIS, c = Catalogue of Life, g = GBIF, b = Bugguide.net

References

Further reading

External links

 
 

Tachinidae